Ilja Glebov (born 22 July 1987 in Tallinn) is an Estonian former competitive pair skater. With former partner Maria Sergejeva, he is the 2007–09 Estonian national champion and competed at the 2010 Winter Olympics in Vancouver. After they parted ways at the end of the 2009–10 season, he considered partnering with another skater but had army service. He is the elder brother of Estonian figure skater Jelena Glebova.

Programs 
With Sergejeva

Competitive highlights
With Sergejeva

GP: Grand Prix; JGP: Junior Grand Prix

References

External links 

 

Estonian male pair skaters
Living people
1987 births
Figure skaters from Tallinn
Figure skaters at the 2010 Winter Olympics
Olympic figure skaters of Estonia
Estonian people of Russian descent